The men's triple jump at the 2010 IAAF World Indoor Championships was held at the ASPIRE Dome on 12 and 14 March.

Medalists

Records

Qualification standards

Schedule

Results

Qualification
Qualification: Qualifying Performance 16.95 (Q) or at least 8 best performers (q) advance to the final.

Final

References
Qualification results
Final results

Triple jump
Triple jump at the World Athletics Indoor Championships